"Breaking the Silence" is the fifth track off Greek power metal band Firewind's fourth studio album Allegiance. It was released as a single to the market of Greece on 2 July 2007. Tara Teresa's vocal performance on the song has been described as "more characteristic of gothic metal and gothic rock than power metal" and compared that of Evanescence's Amy Lee.

Track list
"Breaking the Silence" – 4:03 
"Healing Tool" (Papathanasio, Mark) – 4:43 
"Till the End of Time" (Papathanasio, Gus G.) – 4:58 (live)
"Breaking the Silence" (Ullaeus) – 4:03 (Video clip)

Personnel
 Apollo Papathanasio – vocals
 Gus G. – guitars
 Babis Katsionis – keyboards
 Petros Christodoylidis – bass
 Mark Cross – drums
 Tara Teresa – guest vocals

Footnotes

Firewind songs
2007 singles
2006 songs
Century Media Records singles